A Message from Newport is an album by jazz trumpeter Maynard Ferguson featuring tracks recorded in 1958 and originally released on the Roulette label. The album was recorded in the studio but titled to capitalise on the bands successful appearance at the 1958 Newport Jazz Festival.

Reception

AllMusic awarded the album 3 stars and its review by Ron Wynn states, "Trumpeter Maynard Ferguson leads his big band in a fiery date recorded in 1958... He was playing no-holds-barred, straight-ahead jazz at this time, and doing it with gusto". The Penguin Guide to Jazz commented that Ferguson's upper-register playing was executed exceptionally well, but suggested that the effect of this soon became boring.

Track listing
All compositions by Slide Hampton except as indicated
 "The Fugue" - 3:36
 "Fan It, Janet" (Don Sebesky) - 3:00
 "The Waltz" - 4:00
 "Tag Team" (Willie Maiden) - 5:05
 "And We Listened" (Bob Freedman) - 5:42
 "Slide's Derangement" - 7:55
 "Frame for the Blues" - 6:54
 "Humbug" (Sebesky) - 3:28
 "Three Little Foxes" - 4:04

Personnel 
Maynard Ferguson - trumpet, valve trombone
Bill Chase, Clyde Reasinger, Tom Slaney - trumpet
Slide Hampton, Don Sebesky - trombone
Jimmy Ford - alto saxophone
Carmen Leggio, Willie Maiden - tenor saxophone
Jay Cameron - baritone saxophone
John Bunch - piano 
Jimmy Rowser -bass  
Jake Hanna - drums
Bob Freedman, Slide Hampton, Willie Maiden, Don Sebesky - arrangers

References 

1958 albums
Maynard Ferguson albums
Roulette Records albums